The Great Northeast Collegiate Hockey Conference (GNCHC) was an ACHA Division II ice hockey league based in the Mid-Atlantic region of the United States. The league was disbanded in 2017.

Past teams

Past seasons

See also
 List of ice hockey leagues

ACHA Division 2 conferences